Ashworth is an English surname. Notable people with the surname include:

Abel Ashworth (1864–1938), English rugby union footballer
Alan Ashworth (born 1960), British molecular biologist
Alec Ashworth (1939–1995), English footballer
Andrew Ashworth (born 1947), English criminologist
Andrea Ashworth (born 1969), British writer and academic
Barry Ashworth (footballer) (born 1942), former English footballer
Beverley Ashworth, voiceover artist best known as a former continuity announcer for Granada Television
Caleb Ashworth (1722–1775), English dissenting tutor
Charles Ashworth (died 1832), English major-general
Charles W. Ashworth, known as Charlie Peacock, American record producer, recording artist
Chris Ashworth (born 1975), American actor
Dan Ashworth, English former professional footballer
David Ashworth (1868–1947), English football referee and manager
Dicken Ashworth (born 1946), English actor
Donald Ashworth (born 1931), American musician
Eddie Ashworth (born 1955), American record producer
Ernie Ashworth, American country music singer 
Frank Ashworth (born 1927), Canadian ice hockey player
Fred Ashworth (born 1907), English professional rugby league footballer
Frederick Ashworth (1912–2005), United States naval officer
Gerry Ashworth (born 1942), American sprinter
Henry Ashworth (nonconformist) (1794–1880), Industrialist
Herman Ashworth (1973–2005), American murderer
James Ashworth, British soldier
James Ashworth (runner) (born 1957), British marathon runner
Jean Ashworth Bartle (born 1947), Canadian choral conductor
Jeanne Ashworth (born 1938), American former speed skate
Jenn Ashworth (born 1982), English writer
Jimmy Ashworth (1918–1990), Irish footballer
Joe Ashworth (1943–2002), English footballer
John Ashworth (disambiguation)
Joseph Ashworth (born 1902), English footballer
Katy Ashworth, British children's television presenter
Leigh Ashworth (18th century), British privateer
Luke Ashworth (born 1989), English footballer
Nesta Maude Ashworth (1893–1982), Girl Guider
Peter Ashworth, British photographer
Philip Arthur Ashworth (1853–1921), British lawyer
Philip Ashworth (born 1953), English footballer
Richard Ashworth (born 1947), English Conservative politician
Ricky Ashworth (born 1982), English speedway rider
Samuel Ashworth (1877–1925), English amateur footballer
Samuel Ashworth (co-operator) (1825–1871), English co-operator
Stephanie Ashworth (born 1974), bass player for Australian band 'Something for Kate'
Susan Ashworth, 19th-century British artist
Thomas Ashworth (1864–1935), Australian politician
Tom Ashworth (born 1977), American footballer
Veronica Ashworth (1910–1977), British RAF officer and nurse

Fiction
The family of Ashworth characters in the British soap opera Hollyoaks
List of Hollyoaks characters (2005)#Bill Ashworth
Hannah Ashworth
Josh Ashworth
Neville Ashworth
List of Hollyoaks characters (2007)#Noel Ashworth
Rhys Ashworth
Suzanne Ashworth

English-language surnames